Central Tool Room Extension Centre, Nilokheri i.e. CTR Extension Centre, Nilokheri is a technical institute of Haryana imparting technical training for skill development of technical staff & students of engineering field.

History
Integrated Training Centre, Nilokheri was relinquished due to some conflict between the Principal and Vice-Principal. It was later on 23 June 2014 that the Centre was taken over by Ministry of Micro, Small and Medium Enterprises which led to its development as Extension Centre for Central Tool Room, Ludhiana i.e. Central Tool Room, Extension Centre, Nilokheri was established.

Training Programs 
Central Tool Room Extension Centre, Nilokheri offers post diplomas/degree job oriented technical training programme. Central Tool Room Extension Centrer, Nilokheri is currently running various technical short term courses Like AutoCAD, Pro-E, CNC Milling and Turning Programming and Solidworks. It provides summer training programs for graduates and Under graduates in Engineering or Computer Sciences short term.  This Centre specialises in training technicians in Mechanical engineering related fields.
The training Centre serves the prime importance for summer training by the students of Government Engineering College, Nilokheri, Govt. Polytechnic Nilokheri, Govt. Polytechnic, Umri, University Institute of Engineering and Technology, Kurukshetra University, National Institute of Design, Kurukshetra, National Institute of Technology, Kurukshetra, and near by Technical institutes.

Campus
The institute is situated at the outskirts of Nilokheri township, at a distance of 143 km. from Delhi on National Highway-I towards north.

References

Ministry of Micro, Small and Medium Enterprises
Research institutes in Haryana
Small-scale industry in India
2014 establishments in Haryana
Training organisations in India
Karnal
Nilokheri